The following is a list of coulees located in the province of Alberta, Canada.

List of Coulees

 Appleyard Coulee
 Arrowsmith Coulee
 Becker Coulee
 Big Coulee
 Big Coulee (MD of Ranchland)
 Bish Coulee
 Black Coulee
 Blackfoot Coulee
 Blacktail Coulee
 Bond Coulee
 Boneyard Coulee
 Bratton Coulee
 Brush Coulee
 Bryant Coulee
 Buffalo Coulee
 Bullhorn Coulee
 Bull Springs Coulee
 Calib Coulee
 Chandler Coulee
 Cherry Coulee
 Circus Coulee
 Chin Coulee
 Coal Coulee
 Coal Mine Coulee
 Cronkhite Coulee
 Cross Coulee
 Cut-Off Coulee
 Davy Coulee
 Deadhorse Coulee
 Delmas Coulee
 Dempster Coulee
 Dickson Coulee
 Dry Coulee
 Dunbar Coulee
 Eagle Coulee
 Easy Coulee
 Erickson Coulee
 Etzikom Coulee
 Expanse Coulee
 Finn Coulee
 Forty Mile Coulee
 Fox Coulee
 Frozenman Coulee
 Grande Coulee
 Halifax Coulee
 Hargrave Coulees
 Hastings Coulee
 Hillside Coulee
 Hollis Coulee
 Home Coulee
 Honey Coulee
 Jackknife Coulee
 Jackson Coulee
 Kennedy Coulee
 Kennedy's Coulee
 Kin Coulee
 Kipp Coulee
 Kohler Coulee
 Legend Coulee
 Linquist Coulee
 Lonesome Coulee
 Long Coulee
 Lost Coulee
 Mayme Coulee
 Maher Coulee
 Medicine Lodge Coulee
 McConnell Coulee
 McDougall Coulee
 McNab Coulee
 McPherson Coulee
 Michael Coulee
 Middle Coulee
 Mill Coulee
 Miles Coulee
 Minda Coulee
 Miners Coulee
 Minor Coulee]
 Nine Mile Coulee
 North Easy Coulee
 Pack Trail Coulee
 Philp Coulee
 Pine Coulee
 Piyami Coulee
 Prairie Blood Coulee
 Prairie Coulees
 Quail Coulee
 Ramsay Coulee
 Reeder Coulee
 Red Rock Coulee
 Rice's Coulee
 Rogers Coulee
 Rocky Coulee
 Ross Coulee
 Scott Coulee
 Scotts Coulee
 Shannon Coulee
 Sheep Coulee
 Six Mile Coulee
 Smith Coulee
 South Easy Coulee
 Spruce Coulee
 Squaw Coulee
 Suiste Coulee
 Stornham Coulee
 Tennessee Coulee
 Thirty Mile Coulee
 Timber Coulee
 Trail Coulee
 Twelve Mile Coulee
 Van Cleeve Coulee
 Verdigris Coulee
 Wager Coulee
 White Rock Coulee
 Whitla Coulee
 Wilson Coulee
 Williams Coulee
 Winchell Coulee
 Wolf Coulee
 Woltan Coulee
 Women's Coulee
 Woolf Coulee
 Wynder Coulee

See also
 List of lakes in Alberta
 List of rivers of Alberta

County of Warner No. 5
Coulees
Coulees